Giovanni Battista Brevi (Bergamo, ca. 1650; Milan, after 1725) was an Italian Baroque composer.

His later collections of cantatas comprised three out of the four publications of Fortuniano Rosati, Modena, the fourth being by count Pirro Albergati.

Works
Op. 3 Bizzarrie armoniche, ovvero Sonate da camera a tre stromenti col basso continuo 1693
Op. 5 Cantate morali 1695
Op. 6 La catena d'oro 1696
Op. 7 Cantate ed'ariette 1697
Op. 8 Deliri d'amor divino, o cantate a voce sola e continuo (Venice, 1708)

Performing Editions
Cantatas
Deliciae terrenae: soprano and Basso continuo
O spiritus angelici: alto and Basso continuo
Catenae terrenae: bass and b.c.

Recordings
"Catenae terrenae" on Motetti ed arie Max van Egmond, Ricercar Consort. Ricercar. 1988.
"O Spiritus Angelici" on Agitata Delphine Galou, Accademia Bizantina, Ottavio Dantone, Alpha. 2017

References

1650s births
18th-century deaths
Italian male classical composers
Italian Baroque composers
18th-century Italian composers
18th-century Italian male musicians